Toporishchevo is a rural locality (a village) in Razdolyevskoye Rural Settlement, Kolchuginsky District, Vladimir Oblast, Russia. The population was 4 as of 2010.

Geography 
Toporishchevo is located on the Tsiminka River, 33 km east of Kolchugino (the district's administrative centre) by road. Novosekovo is the nearest rural locality.

References 

Rural localities in Kolchuginsky District